Murexsul is a genus of sea snails, marine gastropod mollusks in the subfamily Muricopsinae  of the family Muricidae, the murex snails or rock snails.

Species
Species within the genus Murexsul include:

 Murexsul aikeni Lussi, 2010
 Murexsul apollo Espinosa & Ortea, 2016
 Murexsul aradasii (Monterosato in Poirier, 1883)
 Murexsul armatus (A. Adams, 1854)
 Murexsul asper Houart, 2004
 Murexsul auratus Kuroda & Habe, 1971
 Murexsul bargibanti (Houart, 1991)
 Murexsul cachoi Espinosa & Ortea, 2016
 Murexsul cevikeri (Houart, 2000)
 Murexsul charcoti (Houart, 1991)
 Murexsul chesleri Houart, 2006
 † Murexsul clifdenensis Finlay, 1930 
 Murexsul coffeebayensis Lussi, 2010
 Murexsul cubacaribaensis Espinosa & Ortea, 2016
 Murexsul cuspidatus (G.B. Sowerby II, 1879)
 Murexsul diamantinus (Houart, 1991)
 † Murexsul dilucidus Marwick, 1931
 Murexsul dipsacus (Broderip, 1833)
 † Murexsul echinophorus Powell & Bartrum, 1929
 Murexsul eduardoi Espinosa & Ortea, 2018
 Murexsul elatensis (Emerson & D'Attilio, 1979)
 Murexsul emipowlusi (Abbott, 1954)
 Murexsul espinosus (Hutton, 1885)
 Murexsul harasewychi Petuch, 1987
 Murexsul huberti (Radwin & D'Attilio, 1976)
 Murexsul ianlochi Houart, 1986
 Murexsul interserratus (G.B. Sowerby II, 1879)
 Murexsul jacquelinae Emerson & D'Attilio, 1969
 Murexsul jahami Merle & Garrigues, 2011
 Murexsul jaliscoensis (Radwin & D'Attilio, 1970)
 Murexsul khareefae Houart & Moolenbeek, 2012 
 Murexsul kieneri (Reeve, 1845)
 Murexsul leonardi (Houart, 1993)
 Murexsul mananteninaensis Houart & Héros, 2015
 Murexsul mariae Finlay, 1930
 † Murexsul marwicki Maxwell, 1971
 Murexsul mbotyiensis (Houart, 1991)
 Murexsul merlei Houart & Héros, 2008
 Murexsul metivieri (Houart, 1988)
 Murexsul micra (Houart, 2001)
 Murexsul mildredae (Poorman, 1980)
 † Murexsul minor Lozouet, 1999 
 Murexsul multispinosus (Sowerby, 1904)
 Murexsul nothokieneri Vokes, 1978
 Murexsul octogonus (Quoy & Gaimard, 1833)
 Murexsul oxytatus (M. Smith, 1938)
 Murexsul pacaudi Van Hyfte & Danvin, 2018
 Murexsul planiliratus (Reeve, 1845)
 † Murexsul praegressus Finlay, 1930 
 † Murexsul pregenitor Laws, 1935
 † Murexsul primigenius Merle & Pacaud, 2019 
 † Murexsul proavitus Laws, 1935
 Murexsul profundus (Marshall & Burch, 2000)
 Murexsul purpurispinus (Ponder, 1972)
 Murexsul queenslandicus Houart, 2004
 Murexsul reunionensis Houart, 1985
 † Murexsul rostralis (Grateloup, 1847) 
 † Murexsul scobina Finlay, 1930
 Murexsul skoglundae (Myers, Hertz & D'Attilio, 1993)
 Murexsul spiculus (Houart, 1987)
 Murexsul sunderlandi (Petuch, 1987)
 Murexsul tokubeii Nakamigawa & Habe, 1964
 Murexsul tokubeii marianae (Houart, 2003)
 Murexsul tokubeii tokubeii Nakamigawa & Habe, 1964
 Murexsul tulensis (Radwin & D'Attilio, 1976)
 Murexsul valae (Houart, 1991)
 Murexsul warreni (Petuch, 1993)
 Murexsul zonatus Hayashi & Habe, 1965
 Murexsul zylmanae (Petuch, 1993)

Species brought into synonymy
 Murexsul conatus McMichael, 1964: synonym of Hexaplex conatus (McMichael, 1964) (original combination)
 Murexsul cuvierensis Finlay, 1927: synonym of Murexsul octogonus (Quoy & Gaimard, 1833)
 Murexsul hexagonus (Lamarck, 1816): synonym of Murexsul pacaudi Van Hyfte & Danvin, 2018
 † Murexsul lividorupis Laws, 1935: synonym of † Coralliophila lividorupis (Laws, 1935) (original combination)
 † Murexsul tepikiensis Powell, 1934: synonym of Coralliophila mira (Cotton & Godfrey, 1932)
 Murexsul westonensis (Myers & D'Attilio, 1990): synonym of Muricopsis westonensis B. W. Myers & D'Attilio, 1990
 Murexsul zeteki (Hertlein & Strong, 1951): synonym of Muricopsis zeteki Hertlein & A. M. Strong, 1951

References

External links
 Iredale T. (1915). A commentary on Suter's Manual of the New Zealand Mollusca. Transactions and Proceedings of the New Zealand Institute. 47: 417-497

 
Muricopsinae